Ignacio Carou and Facundo Mena were the defending champions but chose not to defend their title.

Jesper de Jong and Max Houkes won the title after defeating Guido Andreozzi and Guillermo Durán 7–6(8–6), 3–6, [12–10] in the final.

Seeds

Draw

References

External links
 Main draw

Lima Challenger II - Doubles
2022 Doubles